Jacob Beltzhoover was a pioneer of St. Clair Township in Allegheny County, Pennsylvania.  He and his family received a land grant from the Penn family.  He was one of six sons of Melchior Beltzhoover, a tavern keeper from Hagerstown, Maryland who immigrated from Metterzimmern, Germany in 1752.

Ferry and bridge on the Monongahela

He owned a ferry that ran from the end of Wood Street across the Monongahela.  The ferry was operated by William Graham, who kept a tavern at the northwest corner of Wood and Water Street. The ferry was in operation until 1818, when it was replaced by the Monongahela Bridge, in which he was a shareholder.  One of Beltzhoover's coal wagons was on the bridge when it collapsed in 1832.
  The collapsed north end of the bridge was re-built, and the bridge re-opened on 29 October 1832.  The bridge was destroyed in The Great Fire of Pittsburgh on 10 April 1845.

Mine
In 1825, he opened a mine on the northern side of Mt. Washington, across the river from the town of Pittsburgh.  This penetrated the hill to the southern side in 1861, and was later enlarged to become the Pittsburgh and Castle Shannon Tunnel.

Slavery
He was a slaveholder, with child slaves registered in the county courthouse.

Death and interment
Beltzhoover died in Pittsburgh, Pennsylvania on August 7, 1835. His grave is located at the Allegheny Cemetery in Pittsburgh (section 16, lot 135).

References

People of colonial Pennsylvania
History of Pittsburgh
People from Hagerstown, Maryland
1770 births
1835 deaths
Burials at Allegheny Cemetery